Maksym Stankevych is a Ukrainian retired footballer.

Career
Anatoliy Verteletsky started his career at Borysfen-2 Boryspil and Borysfen Boryspil. In 2003 he moved Systema-Boreks Borodianka while continuing for Borysfen-2 Boryspil. In summer 2004 he returned to Borysfen Boryspil where he played 46 matches and in january 2007 he moved to Desna Chernihiv the main club of Chernihiv. In summer 2007 he moved to Knyazha Shchaslyve.

References

External links 
 Maksym Stankevych at footballfacts.ru
 Maksym Stankevych at allplayers.in.ua

1975 births
Living people
FC Borysfen Boryspil players
FC Desna Chernihiv players
FC Systema-Boreks Borodianka players
FC Knyazha Shchaslyve players
Ukrainian footballers
Ukrainian Premier League players
Ukrainian First League players
Association football defenders